Hankuni  is a village in the Humnabad taluk of Bidar district in Karnataka state, India.

Demographics
Per the 2011 Census of India, Hankuni has a total population of 2668; of whom 1370 are male and 1298 female.

Importance
Hanakuni is famous for the Ancient fort located in the village.

Also known by few Hindu temples like 
Hanuman temple, Lakshmi temple and Bhavani temple.

Hanakuni is well known for its fort located in the village.

See also
Bhatambra
Bhalki
Humnabad
Bidar

References

Villages in Bidar district
Archaeological sites in Karnataka
Forts in Karnataka